Bindiganavile is a village and hobli headquarters in Nagamangala taluka of Mandya District, Karnataka, India. It is about 50 kilometers from Mandya and 130 kilometers from Bangalore. It has a Vaishnava temple dedicated to Garuda who is worshipped here as Vainatheyar. The main deities in the temple are Prasanna Channakeshava and Sowmyanayaki.

External links
The temple website

Villages in Mandya district